The Galeria Bielska, located at 3 Maja 11, Bielsko-Biała, Poland, is one of the most important city galleries in Poland. Since 1962, the gallery has been hosting the Bielska Jesień Contemporary Painting Contest (since 1995 in the format of biennale).

External links
Bielska Gallery website

Art museums and galleries in Poland
Buildings and structures in Bielsko-Biała
Museums in Silesian Voivodeship